Fabrizio Bernal de la Garza (born June 30, 2003) is an American soccer player who plays as a forward for USL Championship side San Antonio FC.

Club career
Born in El Paso, Texas, Bernal began his career as part of the San Antonio FC youth academy before signing a USL academy contract with the USL Championship club on March 3, 2020. He made his professional debut for the club on September 5, 2020, against Rio Grande Valley. Bernal came on as an 86th-minute substitute for Ignacio Bailone as San Antonio won 3–2.

Career statistics

Club

References

External links
Profile at the USL Championship website

2003 births
Living people
American soccer players
Soccer players from Texas
People from El Paso, Texas
Association football forwards
San Antonio FC players
USL Championship players